Robert Linus Alexander Klasen (born 19 February 1986) is a Swedish professional ice hockey player who is currently playing for  Djurgårdens IF of the HockeyAllsvenskan (Allsv).

Playing career
Klasen started his career with Huddinge IK and has played with Södertälje SK in the Swedish Elitserien. He played 3 games with team Sweden in the 2007–08 season.

On 30 October 2010 Klassen made his NHL debut with the Nashville Predators in an away game against the Detroit Red Wings.

Klasen signed a three-year contract with the Malmö Redhawks of the HockeyAllsvenskan on 17 May 2011. He was immediately appointed the team's captain. The contract included an annual salary of 4 million SEK ($0.6 million USD), making him the best paid ice hockey player in Sweden. He scored 50 points (20 goals, 30 assists) in 52 games and helped the team reach a playoff spot. However, due to economical crisis in the Redhawks club, Klasen was forced to leave the club after the 2011–12 season. His contract is being paid out by the Redhawks.

Following the 2011–12 season, Klasen signed a two-year contract with Luleå HF of the Swedish top-tier league Elitserien (SEL) prior to the 2012–13 season. He will keep the same annual salary from Malmö Redhawks during these two years.

After the final year of his contract with Luleå, in which Klasen compiled his most prolific SHL season with 28 goals and 57 points in just 54 games, he left as a free agent to sign a lucrative four-year contract with Swiss club, HC Lugano, of the NLA on 2 April 2014.  In his debut season with Lugano in the NLA, Klasen finished second in team scoring with 55 points in 46 games to be selected in the 2014–15 NLA All-Star Team.

After 6 seasons and 265 games with HC Lugano in the NL, Klasen was not offered a contract extension and decided to return to his native Sweden by signing a two-year deal with Luleå HF of the SHL.

On 10 May 2021 Klasen joined EHC Visp of the second tier Swiss League (SL) on a two-year contract.

Career statistics

Regular season and playoffs

International

Inline Hockey
Linus has competed for Sweden at the 2007, 2008 and 2009 IIHF Inline Hockey World Championships.

References

External links

1986 births
Living people
Djurgårdens IF Hockey players
Huddinge IK players
Lincoln Stars players
HC Lugano players
Luleå HF players
Malmö Redhawks players
Milwaukee Admirals players
Nashville Predators players
Södertälje SK players
Ice hockey people from Stockholm
Swedish ice hockey left wingers
Undrafted National Hockey League players
EHC Visp players